The 2019 San Benedetto Tennis Cup was a professional tennis tournaments played on clay courts. It was the 15th edition of the tournament which was part of the 2019 ATP Challenger Tour. The event took place in San Benedetto del Tronto, Italy, from 15 to 21 July 2019.

Singles entrants

Seeds 

 1 Rankings as of 1 July 2019.

Other entrants 
The following players received wildcards into the singles main draw:
  Riccardo Balzerani
  Francesco Forti
  Lorenzo Musetti
  Gianluigi Quinzi
  Samuele Ramazzotti

The following player received entry into the singles main draw using a protected ranking:
  Íñigo Cervantes

The following player received entry into the singles main draw as an alternate:
  Giulio Zeppieri

The following players received entry into the singles main draw using their ITF World Tennis Ranking:
  Riccardo Bonadio
  Ivan Nedelko
  Christopher O'Connell
  Pietro Rondoni
  Jeroen Vanneste

The following players received entry from the qualifying draw:
  Andrea Basso
  Daniel Elahi Galán

The following player received entry as a lucky loser:
  Walter Trusendi

Champions

Singles 

  Renzo Olivo def.  Alessandro Giannessi 5–7, 7–6(7–4), 6–4.

Doubles

  Ivan Sabanov /  Matej Sabanov def.  Sergio Galdós /  Juan Pablo Varillas 6–4, 4–6, [10–5].

References

San Benedetto Tennis Cup
2019
2019 in Italian tennis
July 2019 sports events in Italy